St. John's Lutheran Church is a congregation of the Lutheran Church–Missouri Synod. located in Caesar Creek Township, Dearborn County, Indiana. Organized in 1843, the congregation has about 300 baptized members.

The historic Gothic Revival style wood frame church (1867), teacherage (1874), school house (1888), two barns, bungalow style parsonage (1930), and school building (1950) constitute a national historic district. It was added to the National Register of Historic Places in 1996.

References

External links

Religious organizations established in 1843
Lutheran churches in Indiana
Churches on the National Register of Historic Places in Indiana
Historic districts on the National Register of Historic Places in Indiana
Gothic Revival church buildings in Indiana
Churches completed in 1867
Churches in Dearborn County, Indiana
Historic districts in Dearborn County, Indiana
National Register of Historic Places in Dearborn County, Indiana
Lutheran Church–Missouri Synod churches